Heather McNaugher is an American poet.

She is an Assistant Professor of English and Creative Writing at Chatham University since 2006 and poetry editor of The Fourth River.

McNaugher has published poems in many literary magazines and earned her PhD at Binghamton University.

Books
 System of Hideouts, poetry (Charlotte, NC: Main Street Rag Publishing Company, 2012).
 Panic & Joy, poetry chapbook (Georgetown, KY: Finishing Line Press, 2008).

Sources
Contemporary Authors Online. The Gale Group, 2012.

External links
 Official website

1969 births
Living people
Writers from Pittsburgh
Binghamton University alumni
21st-century American poets